WFIQ may refer to:

 WFIQ (TV), a television station (channel 36 analog/22 digital) licensed to Florence, Alabama
 Wake Forest Innovation Quarter, a research park in Winston-Salem, North Carolina